Cool Million is an American crime drama series that aired on NBC as an element in its "wheel series" The NBC Wednesday Mystery Movie during its 1972-73 schedule.

Synopsis
James Farentino starred as Jefferson Keyes, a former agent in the clandestine services of the Central Intelligence Agency who, after he left "The Company," as it was also called by its insiders, had established his own private detective agency. Keyes's agency had, indeed, become so successful that he now charged his prospective clients a fee of $1,000,000 (hence the title) per case, which enabled him to live a fabulous lifestyle including his own executive jet.

Barbara Bouchet guest starred in the 1972 season.

Episode list

Reception
Cool Million proved to be less successful than several other elements of the NBC Mystery Movie and was not renewed for further episodes after its initial order.

References
 Brooks, Tim and Marsh, Earle, The Complete Directory to Prime Time Network and Cable TV Shows

External links
 

1972 American television series debuts
1972 American television series endings
1970s American crime television series
1970s American drama television series
English-language television shows
NBC Mystery Movie
NBC original programming
Television series by Universal Television
Television series created by Larry Cohen
Television shows set in Los Angeles